Coronation Street is a British soap opera, broadcast on ITV. Below is a list of characters who made their debut in 1985 in chronological order of first appearance, including Gloria Todd (Sue Jenkins), whose time on the show included brief relationships with Alan Bradley and Mike Baldwin; and Martin Platt, who married Gail Tilsley, and was a regular on the show until 2005, before returning for three episodes in 2018.

Gloria Todd

Gloria Todd was played by Sue Jenkins between 1985 and 1988. She famously served as a bridesmaid at Bet Lynch's 1987 wedding to Alec Gilroy, looking not dissimilar to a milking maid. Gloria was unlucky in love, at one point having a daliance with Alan Bradley. She left the street after stealing the boyfriend of The Rovers cleaner Sandra Stubbs. Sandra called Gloria a tart and threw a pint of beer in her face. Gloria had been a barmaid at the Rovers Return Inn.

Martin Platt

Connie Clayton

Constance "Connie" Clayton and her family moved into 11 Coronation Street in January 1985 and turned their front room into a work room so that Connie could run her dressmaking business. Jack Duckworth bought his wife Vera a dress length of silver lurex and Connie took on the job of producing a dress that 'will make Joan Collins look like a lollipop lady'. Vera was not happy with the results and whilst Connie agreed that the dress looked a right mess on her, she insisted that it fitted properly and was worth the £45 fee but Jack and Vera refused to pay and a feud developed between the families. The fighting between the families was ruining Terry Duckworth's romance with Andrea Clayton and so he tried to pay the bill for his mother, but Connie refused to accept his money. The feud over the dress was soon forgotten when Andrea announced that she was pregnant with Terry's child. Connie stood by her daughter and agreed to look after the baby while Andrea attended university. After Vera started announcing her own plans for her new grandchild, the family did a moonlight flit and moved away from Weatherfield. In December 2000, Connie returned briefly to visit her grandson Paul in hospital after Vera had donated a kidney to him in order to save his life after Terry had refused to be a donor. Connie made peace with Vera and thanked her for saving Paul's life.

Harry Clayton

Harold "Harry" Clayton was a trombone playing milkman, who, with his family, bought 11 Coronation Street off Bill Webster in 1985. A feud developed with the Duckworths, who live next door, after they refused to pay a bill for a dress that Harry's wife, Connie had made for Vera and eventually escalated to violence in the Rovers Return Inn when Jack asked Harry if he was sure that the father of their daughter Andrea's baby was his son Terry. Harry and Connie stood by their daughter and agreed to look after the baby while Andrea attended university. After Vera started announcing her own plans for her new grandchild, the family did a moonlight flit and moved away from Weatherfield.

Sue Clayton

Susan "Sue" Clayton had just left school when she was first seen and later secured a job in a local bakery. Sue left Weatherfield with the rest of her family in a moonlight flit to get away from the Duckworths in order to raise her sister Andrea's baby.

Andrea Clayton

Andrea Clayton moved into 11 Coronation Street in January 1985 with her parents and younger sister.

Whilst studying for her A-levels, Andrea started dating next door neighbour, Terry Duckworth, behind her parents' backs and was shocked to learn that she was pregnant, but refused to allow Terry to be part of the child's life, even though he wanted to stand by her. Her parents decided that the best way forward was for Connie to look after the baby while Andrea went to university. When Vera Duckworth wanted to be involved in plans for her grandchild's future, the Clayton family packed up overnight and left Weatherfield. Eventually word reached Terry that Andrea had given birth to a boy and named him Paul.

Andrea visited the Duckworths' in November 2000 and explained that Paul needed a kidney transplant urgently. Although Terry exploited the situation for his gain, Vera stepped in and saved Paul by giving him one of her kidneys. In November 2001, Andrea brought Paul to Jack's 65th birthday celebrations. This was her last appearance on the show.

Sam Tindall

Sam Tindall was a recurring character played by Tom Mennard for various stints between 1985 and 1989.

Sam himself never married, and was kept company by his dog Dougal, which he kept in a bag. In September 1985, while readying himself for the bowls tournament, he took a fancy to Phyllis Pearce. Phyllis was after Percy Sugden, Sam's competitor in the tournament. Phyllis liked the thought of making Percy jealous by being seen with Sam and so she told Sam she would go to the bowling club outing to Southport with whoever won the finals. In fact, Percy had no interest in Phyllis and was so horrified at the thought of Phyllis having him all to herself that he considered throwing the game - but he was too proud to go through with it and he won. For Phyllis, Sam had now served his purpose, but the battle for her hand continued for some years and Sam was a semi-regular fixture in the Rovers Return Inn and Jim's Café until 1989. Phyllis took more interest in Sam when she found out he won a fortune on the pools in the 1950s and spent it on property. Sam was now penniless as his houses were falling down but he saw this as a way in with Phyllis and made the most of it. He was Phyllis's date for her 65th birthday party, and they were having a good time until Sam saw Phyllis dancing with Percy and accused Phyllis of playing with his affections. Phyllis was upset, until he revealed that he had no fortune to bequeath, upon which the status quo was restored.

In December 1985, Sam offered Terry Duckworth and Curly Watts the use of Dougal to catch a rat in the builder's yard. He tried to swindle them by passing off a ferret as a rat so they'd pay him to catch it. Also that month, Sam won a Christmas pudding in a pub raffle, but a drunken Alf Roberts sat on it at his stag party, and a forlorn Sam annoyed Bet Lynch by accusing her of losing it.

In April 1987, Sam turned up at one of Percy's over-60s tea-dance sessions. Percy entered the group in a competition but the dancers preferred Sam to lead them and voted Percy down. Percy hit back by cancelling their entry into the competition.

Later that year, Sam briefly pursued Vera Duckworth's mother Amy Burton, but by 1988 he was after Phyllis again. Phyllis had come to like having Sam around but she still used him to get to Percy - on one occasion, she complained to Percy that Sam was pestering her, and was then pleased when Percy berated Sam when he overheard Sam telling people he never had much time for women. He last called at the café in May 1989

Janet Bamford

Janet Bamford was a secretary at the Weatherfield Recorder, and worked as Ken Barlow's personal assistant. Janet worked mornings only and cared for her disabled husband John the rest of the time. Unlike her predecessor Sally Waterman, Janet had no journalistic ambitions and was content with her minimal responsibilities, including making the coffee. In her three years at the Recorder, she presented no problems to Ken and they got along well.

In 1988, the Clarion Group bought Bob Statham's share of the Recorder. Statham had been a sleeping partner but the Clarion's boss, Nick Cavanagh, had big ideas for the paper and asked Janet to work overtime however due to John being confined to bed, Janet had to decline. Ken considered the matter closed but Nick pursued it and convinced Ken that they needed someone more dynamic in the office full-time. Ken reluctantly gave Janet her notice. When given the news, Janet was understanding and told Ken she'd been expecting it.

1985
, Coronation Street
Coronation Street